Huedepohlia pisciformis is a species of beetle in the family Cerambycidae, and the only species in the genus Huedepohlia. It was described by Martins and Galileo in 1989.

References

Forsteriini
Beetles described in 1989